Vadgaon Station is a railway station of Pune Suburban Railway on the Mumbai–Chennai line.

Local trains between Pune Junction– and –Lonavala stop here.

The few passenger trains to stop on this station are-
Pune– Passenger.
Mumbai– Fast Passenger.
Mumbai–Bijapur Fast Passenger.

Station has two platforms and a foot overbridge.

References 

Pune Suburban Railway
Pune railway division
Railway stations in Pune district
Year of establishment missing